is a Japanese actress. She won the Award for Best Supporting Actress at the 11th Japan Academy Prize for Gokudō no Onnatachi 2 and Yoshiwara Enjō.

Filmography

Film
 Gokudō no Onnatachi film series (1986–1999)
 Yoshiwara Enjō (1987)
 Nikutai no Mon (1988)
 Ruten no umi (1990)
 Tora-san's Easy Advice (1994)
 Brother (2000)
 Sennen no Koi Story of Genji (2001)
 Kakera: A Piece of Our Life (2010)
 125 Years Memory (2015)
 Code Blue the Movie (2018)
 Godai: The Wunderkind (2020)
 Last of the Wolves (2021), Tamaki
 Bad City (2023)
 Oshorin (TBA)

Television
 Hana no Ran (1994)
 Shiroi Kyotō (2003)
 Tokugawa Fūunroku Hachidai Shōgun Yoshimune (2008)
 Hana Moyu (2015)

References

Japanese film actresses
Japanese television actresses
Living people
1957 births
Actresses from Tokyo
20th-century Japanese actresses
21st-century Japanese actresses